Crash Rickshaw is the debut studio album by Christian rock band Crash Rickshaw.

Track listing
 "Co-Dependent Idolatry" - 3:25
 "Angry Sunset" - 2:55
 "El Gato" - 2:58
 "Time Alone" - 4:07
 "A.N." - 4:00
 "Imperfect Demanding Perfect" - 3:32
 "Thank God I'm An Atheist" - 3:02
 "Johnny Law" - 3:02
 "Self Defeating Mind" - 4:32
 "When" - 3:15

Personnel
Crash Rickshaw
 Joby Harris - vocals, guitar 
 Randy Torres - guitar
 Steven Dail - bass
 Alex Albert - drums

References

2001 debut albums
Tooth & Nail Records albums